Onni Eugen Aleksander Talas  (15 June 1877 – 3 May 1958; till 1895 Gratschoff) was a Finnish lawyer, politician, professor and diplomat, and was a member of the Senate of Finland.

Talas was born in Lappeenranta. He was the Chargé d'affaires to Madrid and Lisbon (1919–1921)  and Envoy to Copenhagen (1930–1934), Budapest (1931–1940), Vienna (1933–1938), Ankara (1934–1940), Sofia (1934–1940), Belgrade (1934–1940), Rome (1940–1944) and the Independent State of Croatia (1941–1942). He was a professor of administrative law at the University of Helsinki in 1925 to 1930.

He died in Helsinki, aged 80 always remembered in the hearts of Finnish politicians and family.

References

1877 births
1958 deaths
People from Lappeenranta
People from Viipuri Province (Grand Duchy of Finland)
Young Finnish Party politicians
National Coalition Party politicians
Finnish senators
Ministers of Justice of Finland
Members of the Parliament of Finland (1909–10)
Members of the Parliament of Finland (1910–11)
Members of the Parliament of Finland (1911–13)
Members of the Parliament of Finland (1913–16)
Members of the Parliament of Finland (1916–17)
Members of the Parliament of Finland (1917–19)
Members of the Parliament of Finland (1927–29)
Members of the Parliament of Finland (1929–30)
People of the Finnish Civil War (White side)
Finnish diplomats
Academic staff of the University of Helsinki
Ambassadors of Finland to Hungary